The  2018 PGA Championship was the 100th PGA Championship, held August 9–12 at Bellerive Country Club in Town and Country, Missouri, a suburb west of St. Louis. This was the second PGA Championship (1992) and third major (1965 U.S. Open) held at Bellerive. It was also scheduled to be the last held in the month of August (although the 2020 tournament would later be moved to August due to the COVID-19 pandemic). Just before the 2017 tournament, the PGA announced that the Championship would move to May in 2019.

Brooks Koepka won his third career major title, finishing two strokes ahead of runner-up Tiger Woods. Koepka's 72-hole total of 264 set a PGA Championship record.

Media
The 2018 PGA Championship was the 35th overall and 28th straight PGA Championship to be televised by CBS, with first and second round coverage provided by Turner Sports for the 28th year. In the UK and Ireland, the Championship was being streamed online by Eleven Sports.

Course layout

Lengths of the course for previous major championships:
, par 71 - 1992 PGA Championship
, par 70 - 1965 U.S. Open

Field
The following qualification criteria were used to select the field. Each player is listed according to the first category by which he qualified with additional categories in which he qualified shown in parentheses.

1. All former winners of the PGA Championship
Rich Beem, Keegan Bradley (9), John Daly, Jason Day (5,7,9,11), Jason Dufner (9), Pádraig Harrington, Martin Kaymer (3,10),  Davis Love III, Rory McIlroy (4,9,10,11), Shaun Micheel, Phil Mickelson (9,10,11), Vijay Singh, Justin Thomas (7,9,11), Jimmy Walker (9,10), Tiger Woods (9), Yang Yong-eun

The following former champions did not enter: Paul Azinger, Mark Brooks, Jack Burke Jr., Steve Elkington, Dow Finsterwald, Raymond Floyd, Al Geiberger, Wayne Grady, David Graham, Don January, John Mahaffey, Larry Nelson, Bobby Nichols, Jack Nicklaus, Gary Player, Nick Price, Jeff Sluman, Dave Stockton, Hal Sutton, David Toms, Lee Trevino, Bob Tway, Lanny Wadkins

2. Winners of the last five Masters Tournaments
Sergio García (10), Patrick Reed (7,9,10,11), Jordan Spieth (3,4,9,10), Bubba Watson (9,11), Danny Willett (10)

3. Winners of the last five U.S. Open Championships
Dustin Johnson (7,9,10,11), Brooks Koepka (7,9,10,11)

4. Winners of the last five Open Championships
Zach Johnson (9,10),  Francesco Molinari (7,9,11), Henrik Stenson (7,9,10,11)

5. Winners of the last three Players Championships
Kim Si-woo (9), Webb Simpson (9,11)

6. Current Senior PGA Champion
Paul Broadhurst

7. Top-15 and ties from the 2017 PGA Championship
Scott Brown, Paul Casey (9,11), Rickie Fowler (9,10), James Hahn, Brian Harman (9), Kevin Kisner (9), Matt Kuchar (9,10), Marc Leishman (9,11), Hideki Matsuyama (9), Ryan Moore (9,10), Jordan Smith, Chris Stroud

Graham DeLaet and Louis Oosthuizen (9)  did not play due to injury.

8. Top-20 in the 2018 PGA Professional Championship
Danny Balin, Rich Berberian Jr., Michael Block, Matt Borchert, Craig Bowden, Matt Dobyns, Jaysen Hansen, Craig Hocknull, Marty Jertson, Zach J. Johnson, Ben Kern, Johan Kok, Sean McCarty, David Muttitt, Jason Schmuhl, Brian Smock, Bob Sowards, Omar Uresti, Ryan Vermeer, Shawn Warren

9. Top-70 leaders in official money standings from the 2017 WGC-Bridgestone Invitational and Barracuda Championship through the 2018 RBC Canadian Open
An Byeong-hun, Ryan Armour (11), Daniel Berger, Rafa Cabrera-Bello (10), Patrick Cantlay (11), Kevin Chappell, Austin Cook (11), Bryson DeChambeau (11), Tony Finau, Tommy Fleetwood, Brian Gay, Emiliano Grillo, Chesson Hadley, Adam Hadwin, Russell Henley, Charley Hoffman, J. B. Holmes (10), Billy Horschel (11), Beau Hossler, Charles Howell III, Kim Meen-whee, Patton Kizzire (11), Andrew Landry (11), Luke List, Kevin Na (11), Alex Norén, Pat Perez (11), Scott Piercy (11), Ted Potter Jr. (11), Ian Poulter (11), Jon Rahm (11), Chez Reavie, Justin Rose (10,11), Xander Schauffele (11), Ollie Schniederjans, Charl Schwartzel, Cameron Smith, J. J. Spaun, Kyle Stanley, Brendan Steele (11), Jhonattan Vegas, Aaron Wise (11), Gary Woodland (11)

10. Members of the United States and Europe 2016 Ryder Cup teams 
Matt Fitzpatrick, Thomas Pieters, Brandt Snedeker, Andy Sullivan, Chris Wood

Lee Westwood did not play due to injury.

11. Winners of tournaments co-sponsored or approved by the PGA Tour since the 2017 PGA Championship
Brice Garnett, Michael Kim, Satoshi Kodaira, Troy Merritt, Andrew Putnam

12. Special invitations
Kiradech Aphibarnrat, Alexander Björk, Jorge Campillo, Stewart Cink, Paul Dunne, Ross Fisher, Ryan Fox, Dylan Frittelli, Jim Furyk, Branden Grace, Bill Haas, Seungsu Han, Justin Harding, Tyrrell Hatton, Yuta Ikeda, Im Sung-jae, Shugo Imahira, Russell Knox, Mikko Korhonen, Anirban Lahiri, Alexander Lévy, Li Haotong, Mike Lorenzo-Vera, Jamie Lovemark, Shane Lowry, Yūsaku Miyazato, Joaquín Niemann, Thorbjørn Olesen, Adrián Otaegui, Eddie Pepperell, Adam Scott, Shubhankar Sharma, Brandon Stone, Julian Suri, Ryuko Tokimatsu, Peter Uihlein, Matt Wallace, Nick Watney

Thomas Bjørn did not play due to a back injury.

13. Players below 70th place in official money standings, to fill the field

Alternates (category 13)
Jason Kokrak (71st in standings; replaced Lee Westwood)
Chris Kirk (72, took spot reserved for WGC-Bridgestone Invitational winner)
Kevin Streelman (79, replaced Thomas Bjørn)
Kelly Kraft (80, replaced Louis Oosthuizen)

Round summaries

First round
Thursday, August 9, 2018

Gary Woodland holed five birdies on the back nine to lead by one over Rickie Fowler. A total of 47 players ended the opening day under par.

Second round
Friday, August 10, 2018

Play was suspended Friday afternoon at 3:35 pm due to dangerous weather with half of the field still on the course. Play was set to resume Saturday morning at 7 am local time with the third round to follow at about 11:15 am. Gary Woodland was the clubhouse leader at 130 (−10), which set a PGA Championship record for low 36-hole score. Two players, Brooks Koepka and Charl Schwartzel, shot record-tying rounds of 63.

Saturday, August 11, 2018

Third round
Saturday, August 11, 2018

Brooks Koepka's 66 gave him a two-shot lead as he attempted to become the first player since Tiger Woods in 2000 to win both the U.S. Open and the PGA Championship in the same season.

Final round
Sunday, August 12, 2018

Summary
Brooks Koepka duplicated his Saturday score of 66 to win by two strokes ahead of runner-up Tiger Woods, who fired a 64 in the best final round of his career in a major. Koepka became the fifth American player to win three majors before the age of 29, joining Jack Nicklaus, Jordan Spieth, Tom Watson and Woods.

His 72-hole score of 264 set the PGA Championship record (previously 265 set by David Toms in 2001) and equaled the lowest total in major championship history (set by Henrik Stenson at the 2016 Open Championship).

Final leaderboard

Note: Top 15 and ties qualify for the 2019 PGA Championship; top 4 and ties qualify for the 2019 Masters Tournament

Scorecard

Cumulative tournament scores, relative to par
{|class="wikitable" span = 50 style="font-size:85%;
|-
|style="background: Pink;" width=10|
|Birdie
|style="background: PaleGreen;" width=10|
|Bogey
|style="background: Green;" width=10|
|Double bogey
|}

References

External links

PGA Media Guide
Coverage on PGA Tour's official site
Coverage on the European Tour's official site

PGA Championship
Golf in Missouri
PGA Championship
PGA Championship
PGA Championship
PGA Championship